Hans Kristian Blomberg (born February 24, 1977 in Hamm-Heessen) is a German radio host.

Career 
Hans Blomberg started his radio career at the local radio station Radio Lippe Welle Hamm, where he hosted a weekly show when he was 17 years old.

After finishing high school in Ahlen, Blomberg began as a volunteer in 1997 at the Lower Saxon radio station Radio ffn in Hannover and there hosted the Hans Blomberg Show in the afternoon from 1997 until 2002.  Starting in 2002, he broadcast as Morgenhans with bigFM, and since 2007 under his real name.

From 2011 until December 2012, Blomberg additionally hosted at 98.8 KISS FM Berlin on Saturday mornings.  At the beginning of January 2013, he moved to Berlin's 104.6 RTL in order to host again under his own name (Hans Blomberg Show), broadcasting on Sunday afternoons.  In addition, he is on air throughout the week during the afternoon or evening.  The Hans Blomberg Show additionally broadcasts Saturdays on 89.0 RTL (since May 4, 2013) for Lower Saxony, Saxony-Anhalt, and Thuringia and on Planet Radio (since November 23, 2013) for Hesse.  Additionally in Hesse, the phone comedy Hans Hart Geweckt (English: Hans wakes up severely) airs from Monday to Friday.

Television 
2007 & 2009: Bundesvision Song Contest

Controversies 
In 2003, the rapper Sabrina Setlur cancelled a live interview with Blomberg.  She had clarified before the show that she did not want to say anything about her recently ended relationship with Boris Becker.  Blomberg consequently asked exclusively pun questions in reference to the baking profession (“baker” in German is “Bäcker” which is pronounced the same as “Becker”).  In 2007, the band Monrose also cancelled a live interview after Blomberg called them “Vorstadtschlampen” (English: “suburban sluts”).

In 2005, Blomberg jumped on stage at a gay festival tent party in Stuttgart disguised as the pope and said: “I love all people.  That is, also men. That is, I am gay!”.

In 2007 at the ProSieben live broadcast of the Bundesvision Song Contest, Blomberg read the score for Rhineland-Palatinate from a note card that said “Raab ist doof” (English: “Raab is stupid”) on the back. The cooperation agreement between bigFM and Raab was consequently not extended in the fourth year by bigFM since Raab requested the radio station to put another host in place besides Blomberg, which bigFM refused.

Blomberg caused another scandal at the 2009 Bundesvision Song Contest when he grabbed the breast of his colleague Susanka Bersin at the scoring for Baden-Württemberg, whereupon she slapped him.  In a newspaper interview, Blomberg commented about the incident, saying that the real scandal had been the slap and not his grabbing of the breast.  Blomberg apologized afterwards on his radio show and also to Bersin personally.

Stage 
In 2007, Blomberg toured through Germany together with his partner Olivia Jones.  In the reading "Sie nannten mich Tittenmonster“ (English: “They Called Me Tits Monster”), the two read letters of the last 40 years to Bravo scout Dr. Sommer.  In 2008, Blomberg tried stand-up comedy on the stage for the first time, in venues such as “Kleinen Wohnzimmer Theater Köln” (English: “Cologne Small Living Room Theater”).

References 
All of the content of this article comes from the equivalent German-language Wikipedia article (see "Deutsch" link in the language list). Retrieved on March 3, 2014. The following references are cited by that German-language article:

German radio personalities
1977 births
Living people